Franz Haslberger (3 December 1914 – 17 September 1939) was a German ski jumper. He competed in the individual event at the 1936 Winter Olympics. He was killed in action during the Invasion of Poland.

References

External links
 

1914 births
1939 deaths
German male ski jumpers
Olympic ski jumpers of Germany
Ski jumpers at the 1936 Winter Olympics
People from Traunstein (district)
Sportspeople from Upper Bavaria
German military personnel killed in World War II